Circassians in Iraq refers to people born in or residing in Iraq who are of Circassian origin. Like all Iraqis, Circassians in Iraq faced various hardships in the modern era, as Iraq suffered wars, sanctions, and civil strife.

History
Iraqis of North Caucasus origin mainly originate from Circassia. The Circassians ame to Iraq in two waves: directly from Circassia, and later from the Balkans. Circassians also settled in large numbers in other neighbouring countries including Turkey, Syria, Jordan, and Palestine.

Demographics
The name "Circassian" usually denotes speakers of  only, however in  the name may denote  in general, including Chechens and Dagestanis, who speak .

The overall number of Circassians or people of North Caucasus origin in Iraq is estimated to be between 30,000 and 50,000, however the total number is unknown. It has been reported that there are 30,000 Adyghe families in Baghdad alone. It is understood that many  have ethnically assimilated into the Iraqi population, becoming Arabicized or Kurdicized.

Surnames such as Al-Daghestani, Al-Shishani ("Chechen"), and Al-Sharkas ("Circassian") are common among Iraqis of  descent.

Population
North Caucasians have settled in all parts of Iraq, from Dohuk in the north to Basrah in the south.

There are also several Circassian villages throughout Iraq, including a neighbourhood in Baghdad.

Culture
North Caucasians in Iraq have integrated into Iraqi society while preserving their traditional culture and customs, such as the Adyghe Xabze. They continue to preserve certain traditions in wedding ceremonies, birth ceremonies, and other special occasions, and to cook their traditional cuisine.

This cultural organization seeks to bring together Iraqis of  heritage.  can be translated as "Solidarity".

North Caucasians in Iraq are predominantly  like their ethnic counterparts in other countries.

Language
The native languages are mainly spoken by the elder generations, with younger people usually speaking only Arabic or Kurdish, the main Iraqi languages.

See also
Circassians in Syria
Circassians in Turkey
Circassians in Iran
Circassian diaspora

References

Iraq
Demographics of Iraq
Ethnic groups in Iraq